St Ninian's Church may refer to any of a number of churches dedicated to Saint Ninian:

in England
 St Ninian's Church, Brougham, Cumbria
 St Ninian's Church, Wooler, Northumberland
 St Ninian's Church, Whitby, North Yorkshire

in Scotland
 St Ninian's Church, Leith, Edinburgh
 St Ninian's Church, Tynet

in Isle of Man
St. Ninian's Church, Douglas, Isle of Man, one of Isle of Man's Registered Buildings